Pelle van Amersfoort (born 1 April 1996) is a Dutch professional footballer who plays as an attacking midfielder for Eredivisie club SC Heerenveen.

Club career
Born in Heemskerk, Van Amersfoort is a youth exponent from Heerenveen. He made his Eredivisie debut on 20 September 2014 against Vitesse Arnhem replacing Morten Thorsby after 66 minutes in a 1–1 draw.

On 29 November 2022, van Amersfoort signed a 2.5-year contract with Heerenveen.

Honours
Cracovia
 Polish Cup: 2019–20
 Polish Super Cup: 2020

References

External links
 
 

1996 births
Living people
People from Heemskerk
Footballers from North Holland
Association football midfielders
Dutch footballers
Netherlands youth international footballers
SC Heerenveen players
MKS Cracovia (football) players
Almere City FC players
Eredivisie players
Eerste Divisie players
Ekstraklasa players
Dutch expatriate footballers
Expatriate footballers in Poland
Dutch expatriate sportspeople in Poland